Flavia Gaviglio (born 8 September 1963) is a former Italian female mountain runner, silver medal at the 1998 European Mountain Running Championships.

Biography
At individual senior level she won 6 medals with the national team) at the World Mountain Running Championships. She competed at four editions of the IAAF World Cross Country Championships at senior level (1994, 1998, 2001, 2005).

Team results
World Mountain Running Championships (6 medals)
 1999, 2001, 2004 (3)
 1996, 1997, 2000 (3)

National titles
Italian Mountain Running Championships
 1996, 2001, 2004 (3)

References

External links
 

1963 births
Living people
Italian female mountain runners
Italian female middle-distance runners
Italian female long-distance runners